Myki, stylised as myki, is a reloadable credit card-sized contactless smart card ticketing system used for electronic payment of fares on most public transport services in Melbourne and regional Victoria, Australia. Myki replaced the Metcard ticketing system and became fully operational at the end of 2012.

The system was developed by Kamco (Keane Australia Micropayment Consortium) and is used by Public Transport Victoria. The initial 10-year contract was worth approximately A$1.5 billion, described by The Age as "the [world's] biggest for a smartcard ticketing system". The Myki contract was extended in July 2016 for a further seven years.

Ticketing requirements for trains, trams and buses in Melbourne are mainly contained in the Transport (Compliance and Miscellaneous) (Ticketing) Regulations 2017 and the Victorian Fares and Ticketing Manual.

The Myki agreement with the Victorian government is set to expire in November 2023, and opponents of the system are seeking to scrap the program in favor of alternatives, including simple smartphone and card payment options adopted in London.

Usage

Operation
Passengers can purchase a rechargeable Myki smartcard from the ticket office at a staffed railway station, Myki machines at railway stations and major bus and tram interchanges (full fare only), the PTV Hub at Southern Cross railway station, from a retailer (including most 7-Eleven outlets) displaying the Myki sign, online at ptv.vic.gov.au, or by phoning Public Transport Victoria. Cards cannot be bought onboard trams or buses. A full fare card costs $6, and a concession or child card costs $3.

After acquiring a Myki, the passenger needs to add value onto the card, in a process called "topping up". The value stored on the card is called "Myki money". Top up is available at the same places as card purchase, or "auto top up" can be set up to recharge the card from a linked credit card or bank account automatically when the Myki money balance falls to a set threshold. Top up is also available using the PTV app.

To use Myki when travelling, a passenger holds the card against a reader (called "touching on" or "touching off"). Passengers touch on at the start of a trip and (except for a tram trip within Zone 1) touch off at the end of the trip, at which point the appropriate fare is assessed and deducted from the stored Myki money value on the card. If the fare for a trip is greater than the stored Myki money balance remaining, the card will show a negative Myki money balance, in which case it cannot be touched on again until it has been topped up to reach a positive amount of money. Passengers do not need to touch on or off for tram trips entirely within in the city's "Free Tram Zone", which covers roughly the CBD.

Mobile Myki 
Mobile Myki is a virtual Myki card on an Android phone using Google Wallet. Stored value and fares calculation works in the same way as a normal Myki, and the phone is held against a Myki reader to touch on or off.
Note: Mobile Myki cards need to be registered in the same process as regular Myki Cards and are not automatically linked to the user.

Services available 
A Myki card can be used for travel on:
 Melbourne metropolitan train, tram and bus services including SmartBus, but not Skybus services
 V/Line trains travelling within the V/Line commuter belt (between Melbourne and Seymour, Traralgon, Wendouree, Waurn Ponds, and Epsom/Eaglehawk stations)
 Regional buses in major towns within the commuter belt (e.g., Ballarat, Bendigo, Geelong and the Latrobe Valley).

Card types
There are Myki cards for full fare, concession, child and Victorian seniors passengers.

Myki cards were originally issued with a green front, featuring different designs showing a selection of playful symbols on the front, and with different city-related photographs on the back depending on the type of card. After a redesign in late 2014, Myki cards now have a predominantly grey/black design on the front, meaning it is no longer possible to visually distinguish between full fare and concession cards.

A "Myki Explorer" pack is available, intended for use by interstate and overseas visitors (or an option for users from outside metropolitan Melbourne). Full fare packs cost $16 and child, concession and seniors packs cost $8. The pack includes a Myki card pre-loaded with $10 (full fare) or $5 (concession), which is enough for one day's worth of travel in Zones 1 and 2; the pack also includes vouchers for discounts at major tourist attractions, instructions on how to use Myki, and a protective Myki wallet. Users can reclaim any unused balance on their Myki when they no longer need it, but not the $6 or $3 purchase price. The pack is sold from locations such as Melbourne Airport, hotel concierge desks, backpacker and bed & breakfast accommodation facilities, tourist information centres, Station Pier, Melbourne, Southern Cross station and other outlets.

Card registration 
Myki cards and Mobile Myki can be "registered" with Public Transport Victoria (PTV), which protects the card holder against loss of the card and enables the holder to view their travel history online. It also enables "auto top up" to be set up, enables the card holder to view the card expiry date online and allows PTV to contact the registered card holder of an imminent card expiry date.

Fare calculation and default fares 

Myki is a multi-modal fare and ticketing system based on zones. Metropolitan Melbourne is divided into two zones (Zones 1 and 2). Outside of metropolitan Melbourne there are a further eleven zones (Zones 3–13). There are areas of overlap between some zones (notably Zones 1 and 2), where locations exist within both zones.

The Myki system calculates the cheapest fare for a passenger based on the time and zone(s) travelled in on a given day. Fares are assessed on the basis of a two-hour fare or a daily fare. Longer periods, of 7 days or 28–365 days, can be pre-loaded into the card as a Myki pass giving unlimited travel within a nominated zone or zones for the relevant period. If a 365-day pass is purchased, the days above 325 are free of charge. Myki fares are based on the time and zone fares used under the previous Metcard system (with zones expanded to cover the V/Line commuter belt), with the exception of the single trip "City Saver" fare which was not made available under the Myki system.

If a Myki card is not touched off at the completion of a journey the system will charge a default fare, which is usually equal to the most expensive journey that could have been undertaken by a passenger, based on the location of touch on. Passengers do not need to touch off when alighting a tram unless their travel is only in Zone 2.

Prior to the introduction of Myki, a separate fares and ticketing system existed for all V/Line (country) services, based on paper tickets. This system still operates on V/Line services that run outside of the commuter belt area.

Card expiry 
A Myki card has a limited validity period, but the expiry date is not printed on the card. A physical card expires four years after the date on which it is purchased. Mobile Myki expires after two years.  If the card is registered, the holder can see online the date on which the card expires. PTV also contacts the registered card holder shortly before the expiry date to remind them of the card's imminent expiry. Holders of anonymous cards must use a card vending machine or Myki Check machine to find out when their card will expire.

An Myki card that has expired or is expiring in the next 60 days can be replaced for free at staffed metropolitan railway stations, Myki-enabled V/Line stations or a PTV Hub, with any balance from the expired/expiring card being transferred to the new card instantly. Alternatively, users can post their expired/expiring Myki card to PTV and wait up to 10 working days for a new card to be posted to them. If the expired/expiring card was registered, the replacement card will be automatically registered. Auto top-up will not be transferred to the new Myki and, if desired, needs to be set up again. To obtain a replacement for a personalised Myki card, users must mail their card to PTV.

History 

Myki replaced the Metcard ticketing system in metropolitan Melbourne, and various ticketing systems used by buses in some major regional cities. Work on the new public transport ticketing system for Victoria commenced in late 2002. In June 2003, the Transport Ticketing Authority (TTA) was established to procure and manage the new system. On 12 July 2005, the Kamco consortium was awarded the $494 million contract to develop the system, with the completion date being 2007. The consortium was made up of Keane Inc, Ascom, ERG, and Giesecke & Devrient Australasia.

A pilot program was due to begin in early 2007, but was delayed by approximately a year. In February 2008, Public Transport Minister, Lynne Kosky, announced that the full roll-out of the system would not begin until the end of the year. By March the same year, the minister said that the system would not be operational until 2010. In April 2008, the TTA announced that it had stopped making service payments to the Kamco consortium after April 2007, because the project had not been delivered on schedule.

The first field trial of the new Myki system was held on the Geelong bus network in late 2007, which identified problems. In August 2008 testing began on the Melbourne suburban train and tram networks.

On 12 December 2008, Myki went on sale to the general public on four bus routes in Geelong, and on 2 March 2009 all bus routes in the Geelong and Bellarine Peninsula area were completely switched to Myki. In April 2009, all bus services in Ballarat, Bendigo and Seymour were converted to Myki. In May 2009, all bus services in the Latrobe Valley towns of Moe, Morwell, Traralgon and Warragul were operating with Myki equipment, making it the last regional bus system to be converted.

Melbourne roll-out
The Melbourne roll-out began in July 2007 with the installation of Myki readers. Myki became valid for travel on all metropolitan train services, but not trams and buses, from 29 December 2009, though the system of purchasing cards was still cumbersome. On 25 July 2010, Myki coverage was extended to Melbourne metropolitan bus and tram services.

During 2012, the government progressively shut down the Metcard system:
 from the start of 2012, yearly Metcards became unavailable
 from 26 March 2012, monthly and weekly Metcards became unavailable
 from 30 June 2012, "value" Metcards, such as 10x2 hour, 10xEarly Bird, 5xDaily, 5xWeekend Daily, 5xSeniors Daily, 10xCity Saver, Sunday Saver and Off-Peak Daily became unavailable. Only single-use 2-hour, Daily, City Saver and Seniors Daily Metcards continued to be available.

All Metcard ticket vending machines on railway stations were removed or switched off. The only Metcard vending machines still in operation were on trams. The limited remaining range of Metcards could only be purchased from staff at premium stations, from bus drivers, or from a PTV Hub. The sale of Metcards at Premium (staffed) Metro railway stations was progressively phased out, and ceased entirely during October. The removal of Metcard validators from railway stations started on 12 November 2012. Also from November, passengers with unused Metcards were able to transfer the value onto a Myki card as Myki money at premium Metro railway stations.

On 29 December 2012, Metcard was switched off, and Myki became the only form of ticket valid on Melbourne public transport. On the same day, all Metcard equipment remaining on the system became inoperative.

It was intended that the Skybus Melbourne Airport shuttle bus service (with its own, premium fares) would also accept Myki once the system was fully operational, but this did not happen.

In May 2014, the first Myki electronic gates with a touch screen became operational.

Regional implementation
Myki came into use on regional "commuter" (short-haul) rail services in July 2013, in a staged process: between Melbourne and Seymour on 24 June, on the Traralgon line on 8 July, the Bendigo line on 17 July, the Ballarat line on 24 July, and the Geelong-Marshall line on 29 July. Paper family tickets are available to families travelling within the Myki zone with children below 17 years of age. On 10 November 2013, Myki was introduced on Wallan and Kilmore town buses.

On 25 February 2014, paper tickets for passengers on V/Line commuter services were abolished, and passengers were required to use Myki. Paper tickets remain for travel outside the Myki zone, such as to Warrnambool, Bairnsdale, Swan Hill, Shepparton or Albury. Passengers with Myki Pass who want to travel beyond the Myki area can purchase paper "extension tickets" to cover the rest of their journey.

COVID-19 pandemic

The COVID-19 pandemic resulted in significant changes to public transport in Victoria during periods of lockdown. Decreased patronage and public health concerns resulted in some changes being made to myki.

On 10 July 2021, the facility to top up on buses was halted.

Several temporary changes to fares were also introduced. A 30% discount for off-peak travel ran from 31 January to 24 August 2021 (defined as trips made between 9.30am and 4pm or after 7pm on weekdays). The stated aim was to decrease overcrowding on public transport vehicles by encouraging people to travel during less busy times of the day wherever possible. Vouchers were released for one day of free public transport travel to encourage more people to visit the central city area. In December 2021, 250,000 vouchers were offered for use. The facility to 'pause' or receive a refund of myki passes previously purchased was made available for periods of lockdown where most travel was banned.

Issues and criticisms 
The Myki ticketing system has been criticised on a number of grounds:
 Necessity: Critics, such as the Public Transport Users Association, questioned why a new ticketing system was needed when Melbourne already had an adequate one. The Metcard validating equipment already had built-in support for a contactless ticket (the yellow circles on the front of the former Metcard validators, as well as on Ticket Vending Machines.
 Its total cost of $1.5 billion.
 Extended delivery timeframe. The project began in May 2005 with a scheduled delivery date of March 2007. Full delivery eventually took until 2013.
 Lack of a short-term ticket: The decision not to proceed with the planned introduction of short-term tickets in Melbourne, and to abolish them on regional town bus services, meant that Myki is now one of the world's few ticketing systems on which visitors and occasional users cannot buy a short-term ticket. A total of 50 million short-term tickets, costing $15 million, were pulped. 
 The lack of ticket sales or top up facilities on board trams, a facility which was available under previous ticketing systems. As a result, tram passengers must have bought and topped up a myki before they board the vehicle.  Options to do this through the retail network are limited, particularly in the outer suburbs and after hours where Myki retailers (except 7-Eleven) have closed while trams can still be running.
 Privacy: In 2010 the Opposition expressed concern over the data collection and sharing used by Myki, claiming that the Government was breaching its own Information Privacy Act.

Problems 
 On 29 December 2009, the reputation of Lynne Kosky, the Public Transport Minister at the time, was put into question when Kosky was unable to recall the phone number for commuters to buy a ticket, and a computer error resulted in over 1,600 people receiving new Myki cards with their name incorrectly spelled or printed as 'anonymous'.
 Due to Myki's protracted introduction, the government had to continually extend payments for the existing Metcard system alongside Myki. This was done to ensure commuters had a chance to switch over to Myki before Metcard was removed from the transport network.
 Newsagents initially refused to sell Myki cards because lower commissions were being offered by the government in comparison to Metcard.
 Controversies over the tendering process.  A staff member of the TTA left a USB flash drive in a room with representatives of one of the bidders.  The TTA said this was an accident and that there was no confidential information on the flash drive. Also, the company hired by the TTA early in the process to give it technical advice was part of the winning consortium. 
 Increased dwell times: Tests commissioned by the Government in 2007 suggested longer stationary times for trams compared to the Metcard system as a result of passengers needing to touch on and off when boarding and disembarking. As a result, when Myki was made available on trams in 2009 the requirement to touch off was removed.
 Potential for a higher fare to be charged if a user forgets to touch off: The cost of a trip after which the user has not touched off (deliberately or accidentally) may be higher than the fare the passenger would have paid if they had touched off. 
 Disability Access: Disability groups claimed that several elements of the Myki program would be problematic for users with a disability (particularly people in wheelchairs, or those with cognitive limitations or who lack dexterity) due to the placement of several pieces of equipment. On low-floor trams, Myki readers have been installed at various heights to cater for this.  The Government introduced a free Access Travel Pass for users who are unable to use Myki ticketing equipment as a result of a permanent disability.
 Rules covering faulty cards: The TTA originally stated that passengers who had a faulty Myki card would need to buy a replacement Myki card if they wanted to travel and seek reimbursement later. This replicated the rule for faulty Metcards. Users are now able to go to a staffed railway station to have a faulty Myki replaced on the spot.
 Auto top-up failure problem: Originally, when the auto top-up feature of Myki failed due to insufficient funds, the card was blocked and had to be posted to Myki to be reactivated. Now the auto top-up request is removed from the card, and the original top up amount is reversed from the Myki.
 Ticket vending machines receipt issuing: Topping up a Myki using EFTPOS or credit card displays a screen asking the user if they would like a receipt to be printed. If "no" was selected, an EFT transaction record was printed anyway, which contained the credit card user's full name, expiry date and 9 of 16 credit card digits.  This was subsequently changed to show only the last four digits of the credit card with the card holder's name no longer printed, and eventually to prevent the printing of receipts when "no" had been selected.
 Vandalism: Particularly in the early days of myki, there were widespread reports of damage to Myki equipment, with up to 60% of machines being targeted by vandals. Display screens on fare payment devices and card vending machines could be smashed by heavy objects, rendering the displays unusable, or by marker pen, paint or scratching obscuring information. In mid-2013 it was reported that Myki machines at some railway stations had been broken into using portable power tools, in order to raid their cash boxes. While Myki readers will often still work despite surface vandalism, passengers might not be able to read the information displayed on the reader's screen.
 On 11 June 2015, a Melbourne commuter found her card showed a negative balance of $2,684,350.00.

Notes

See also
 List of smart cards
 Opal card – Sydney's smartcard ticketing system
 Translink go card – South East Queensland’s smartcard system
 SmartRider – Perth's smartcard system
 Metrocard (Adelaide) – Adelaide's smartcard system

References

External links
Myki website
Victorian Fares and Ticketing Manual
Public Transport Victoria Website
Buy a myki and top up

Fare collection systems in Australia
Public transport in Melbourne
Contactless smart cards
Companies based in Victoria (Australia)
2008 establishments in Australia
Transport companies established in 2008